Moussa Diallo (born 27 January 1997) is a French footballer who plays for Servette as a right back.

Club career
Diallo came through the youth system at AJ Auxerre, making his professional debut on 30 July 2016 as a substitute against Red Star. He joined Cholet in January 2019.

International career
Diallo was born in France and is of Mauritanian descent. He was called up to the senior Mauritania national football team for a pair of friendlies in August 2017, but withdrew without making an appearance for the team.

Career statistics

References

External links
 
 
 

1997 births
Living people
Footballers from Essonne
French footballers
French sportspeople of Mauritanian descent
Association football midfielders
AJ Auxerre players
SO Cholet players
Servette FC players
Ligue 2 players
People from Corbeil-Essonnes